Anemonastrum flaccidum, the flaccid anemone or soft windflower, is a plant species in the family Ranunculaceae. It is a perennial growing to 0.1 m (0ft 4in).

Features
Depending on the region, it flowers between March and June. The flowers are about 2 cm in diameter with white calyx. Many stems have two flower stalks characteristically extending from one stem, and this is the origin of the plant's Japanese name (literally, 'two-flowered plant'). The plant spreads with rhizomes, and so it often forms communities.

Range
Anemonastrum flaccidum occurs naturally along the Amur River; in Sakhalin; in central, eastern and southern China; in Korea and in Japan. It is sometimes grown as an ornamental plant in places such as Sweden.

Habitat
It is found in moist places out of direct sunlight (full shade or semi-shade) and near streams and ravines in loose peaty soils.

Gallery

References

 Anemone flaccida (flaccid anemone)

External links
 Anemone flaccida - F.Schmidt.

flaccidum